Senator Gilfillan may refer to:

Charles Duncan Gilfillan (1831–1902), Minnesota State Senate
John Gilfillan (1835–1924), Minnesota State Senate